The men's 4x400 metres relay at the 2013 IPC Athletics World Championships was held at the Stade du Rhône from 20 to 29 July.

Medalists

See also
List of IPC world records in athletics

References

4x400 metres relay
4 × 400 metres relay at the World Para Athletics Championships